Dermanyssidae is a family of mites in the order Mesostigmata.

Genera

Acanthonyssus Yunker & Radovsky in Wenzel & Tipton 1966
Acanthonyssus dentipes (Strandtmann & Eads, 1947)
Dermanyssus Dugès, 1834
Dermanyssus americanus Ewing, 1923
Dermanyssus antillarum Dusbabek & Cerny, 1971
Dermanyssus apodis Roy, Dowling, Chauve & Buronfonsse, 2009
Dermanyssus brevirivulus Gu & Ting, 1992
Dermanyssus brevis Ewing, 1936
Dermanyssus carpathicus Zeman, 1979
Dermanyssus chelidonis Oudemans, 1939
Dermanyssus faralloni Nelson & Furman, 1967
Dermanyssus gallinae (DeGeer, 1778)
Dermanyssus gallinoides Moss, 1966
Dermanyssus grochovskae Zemskaya
Dermanyssus hirsutus Moss & Radovsky, 1967
Dermanyssus hirundinis (Hermann, 1804)
Dermanyssus lacertarum (Contarini, 1847)
Dermanyssus longipes Berlese & Trouessart
Dermanyssus nipponensis Uchikawa & Kitaoka, 1981
Dermanyssus passerinus Berlese & Trouessart, 1889
Dermanyssus prognephilus Ewing, 1933
Dermanyssus quintus Vitzthum, 1921
Dermanyssus richiardii G. Canestrini & Fanzago, 1877
Dermanyssus rwandae Fain, 1993
Dermanyssus transvaalensis Evans & Till, 1962
Dermanyssus triscutatus Krantz, 1959
Dermanyssus trochilinis Moss, 1978
Dermanyssus wutaiensis Gu & Ting, 1992
Draconyssus Yunker & Radovsky in Wenzel & Tipton 1966
Draconyssus belgicae Yunker & Radovsky in Wenzel & Tipton 1966
Laelaspisella Marais & Loots, 1969
Laelaspisella epigynialis Marais & Loots, 1969
Laelaspisella foramenis (Karg, 1989)
Liponyssoides Hirst, 1913
Liponyssoides adsonis Domrow, 1992
Liponyssoides bengalensis Gupta, 1979
Liponyssoides eudyptulae Fain & Galloway, 1993
Liponyssoides intermedius (Evans & Till, 1964)
Liponyssoides lukoschusi Domrow, 1979
Liponyssoides muris (Hirst, 1913)
Liponyssoides sangineus (Hirst, 1914)
Liponyssoides warnekei Domrow, 1963

References

Mesostigmata
Taxa named by Friedrich August Rudolph Kolenati
Acari families